City Connexion Airlines was an airline based in Burundi. The airline ceased all operations in 2000, however,  no source for a declared bankruptcy has been found. The IATA code for the airline was later re-used by Gol Linhas Aéreas Inteligentes in Brazil.

Fleet

As of August 2006, the City Connexion Airlines fleet still included the following aircraft, though no flights were being operated:

1 Let L-410 UVP

References

Defunct airlines of Burundi
2000 disestablishments in Burundi
Airlines disestablished in 2000
Airlines with year of establishment missing